Acacia leptoloba, also known as Irvinebank wattle, is a shrub of the genus Acacia and the subgenus Plurinerves that is endemic to an area of north eastern Australia.

Description
Like most species of Acacia it has phyllodes rather than true leaves.

Taxonomy
The species was first formally described by the botanist Leslie Pedley in 1978 as part of the work A revision of Acacia Mill. in Queensland, Part 1 as published in the journal Austrobaileya. It was reclassified by Pedley in 1987 as Racosperma leptolobum then returned to genus Acacia in 2001.

Distribution
It has a scattered distribution over the Cape York Peninsula of Far North Queensland down to around Herberton in the south where it is commonly situated on hills and along creeks growing in sandy soils. The plant is quite common around the Irvinebank area.

See also
List of Acacia species

References

leptoloba
Acacias of Western Australia
Taxa named by Leslie Pedley
Plants described in 1978